Kapanalan is a village in the Bozüyük District, Bilecik Province, Turkey. Its population is 305 (2021).

References

Villages in Bozüyük District